State Road 258 (NM 258) is a  state highway in the US state of New Mexico. NM 258's western terminus is a continuation as South Roosevelt Road 41 west of Milnesand, and the eastern terminus is at NM 206 and the western terminus of NM 262 in Milnesand.

Major intersections

See also

References

258
Transportation in Roosevelt County, New Mexico